Pselaphostena longepalpalpis is a beetle in the genus Pselaphostena of the family Mordellidae. It was described in 1951 by Franciscolo.

References

Mordellidae
Beetles described in 1951